Kumla Church (Swedish: Kumla kyrka) is located in Kumla kyrkby in Sala Municipality in Västmanland, Sweden.

History
The church was built of fieldstone around 1300 and included a longhouse and a small bell tower. At the end of the 15th century the wood roof was replaced by a brick star vault with church wall paintings signed by Albertus Pictor. In the 18th century the windows were made larger and the current bell tower was built.

Features
The pulpit with six-sided basket was added in 1665. The baptismal font, made of Scottish sandstone by sculptor Erik Sand, was completed in 1951.

References
Specific

General
Medieval Wooden Sculpture in Sweden: Late Medieval sculpture, Bengt Thordeman and Aron Andersson (1980), p. 274

External links
Pictures on Wikimedia Commons

Churches in Västmanland County
Churches in the Diocese of Västerås
14th-century churches in Sweden
Church frescos in Sweden